The Milan Metro subway system is managed by a single ATM control centre, built in 2013 by Alstom.

Lines 1 and 2 

Line 2 uses a speed signaling system. Trains are directed using light signals with five aspects:
Imperative red: The train must stop.
Permissive red: The train can go on with a maximum speed of 15 km/h (9 mph) and must stop in case of danger. Physically, it's represented by a fixed or flashing "P" under the semaphore.
Red-yellow: The train can reach 30 km/h (18 mph).
Yellow: The train can reach 50 km/h (31 mph).
Green: The train can reach the line's speed limit: 85 km/h (53 mph) for the red line and 75 km/h (47 mph) for the green line.

Before 2011, Line 1 used this same system, but now uses a new signaling apparatus. The signaling apparatus permits a 90-second frequency on the line, similar to the one used on the M3 line. The speed of the train is decided by an ATC system and a two-color semaphore system. 

The two-color semaphore system has three possible states:
Red: Imperative red.
Red and white: Conditional green.
White: Green.

Line 3 
Line 3 has an ATO/ATP system, so the driver must only check the doors and give consent to the electronic system to start the train.

Line 5 
Line 5 uses AnsaldoBreda Driverless Metro, consequently the line does not have classical light signaling. Automatic signaling permits a frequency of a train every 75 seconds, but today only a 90-second frequency is used.

References

See also 
Italian railway signalling

Milan Metro